British Standard Cycle (BSC or BSCy) is a British Imperial screw thread standard. Unlike other major British imperial thread standards (British Standard Whitworth and British Standard Fine) the thread runs at a 60 degrees rather than a 55 degrees angle.  All sizes  inch and larger use 26 threads per inch (tpi), making them similar to 1 mm ISO threads, which are 25.4 per inch and also run at a 60 degrees angle.  It was originally used with both bicycles and motorcycles. However it is now believed to be obsolete in motorcycle manufacture. In the bicycle industry it is still found on virtually all bottom bracket threads and the wheel axles of low-end models manufactured in China, which are derived from pre-WWII British roadsters.

Traditionally the parts it would be found on are:
 Front axle and seat pin clamp bolt  diameter, 24 or 26 tpi threading
 Rear axle  diameter, 26 tpi
 GB Stems using  diameter, 26 tpi for the handlebar clamp

Note that M8 × 1.00 metric threaded parts can interchange with  diameter × 26 tpi parts with a "Class B fit", meaning you should not go back and forth between threadings.

British Bicycle standards for other parts which are not strictly BSC but come in similar fine threads include:

 Bottom Bracket cups diameter with a 24 tpi ISO standard or a 26 tpi Raleigh (now obsolete) standard

History
The thread was defined to meet a requirement for a thread form for bicycles and motorcycles, originally specified by the Cycle Engineering Institute. Before being adopted as a British Standard it was known as the CEI thread.

 See also 
 Raleigh Bicycle Company

References

Thread standards
Screws
British Standards